Ocnița is a commune in Dâmbovița County, Muntenia, Romania with a population of 4,311 people. It is composed of a single village, Ocnița.

References

Communes in Dâmbovița County
Localities in Muntenia